MV Leirna is a double ended ro-ro ferry operated by SIC Ferries. She operates between Bressay and Lerwick.

History
As vehicles grew in size and more and more islanders started to drive, the need for a larger ferry was identified. The previous Bressay ferry MV Grima was simply too small for Bressay's needs. Plans were drawn up for a larger modern ferry, the Leirna. MV Leirna was built by Ferguson Shipbuilders, Glasgow in 1992. As one of the first "New" ferries in the SIC she is widely considered the flagship of the fleet.

She is operated by the local authority and provides the lifeline Bressay service between Bressay and Lerwick

Layout
The Leirna has a main car deck with 3 lanes for vehicles. There are two passenger saloons with excellent views across Lerwick harbour. Situated in the upper passenger saloon there is an unused vending machine with a selection of hot and cold drinks. Each saloon has a toilet.

Service
The Leirna operates the Bressay Ferry Service linking Lerwick on the Shetland Mainland to Maryfield, Bressay. She was purpose built for this route.

References

1992 ships
Transport in Shetland